Matej Ašanin (born 4 September 1993) is a Croatian handball player who last played for RK Zagreb and the Croatian national team.

He represented Croatia at the 2020 European Men's Handball Championship.

References

External links

1993 births
Living people
Handball players from Zagreb
Croatian male handball players
RK Zagreb players
CB Ademar León players
Liga ASOBAL players
Expatriate handball players
Croatian expatriate sportspeople in Portugal
Croatian expatriate sportspeople in Spain
Competitors at the 2018 Mediterranean Games
Mediterranean Games gold medalists for Croatia
Mediterranean Games medalists in handball
21st-century Croatian people